Paleo-Sardinian, also known as Proto-Sardinian or Nuragic, is an extinct language, or perhaps set of languages, spoken on the Mediterranean island of Sardinia by the ancient Sardinian population during the Nuragic era. Starting from the Roman conquest with the establishment of a specific province, a process of language shift took place, wherein Latin came slowly to be the only language spoken by the islanders. Paleo-Sardinian is thought to have left traces in the island's onomastics as well as toponyms, which appear to preserve grammatical suffixes, and a number of words in the modern Sardinian language.

Pre-Indo-European hypothesis
The Swiss linguist Johannes Hubschmid proposed six linguistic layers in prehistoric Sardinia.

There is toponymic evidence suggesting that the Paleo-Sardinian language may have had connection to the reconstructed Proto-Basque and to the Pre-Indo-European Iberian language of Spain. Eduardo Blasco Ferrer concluded that it developed in the island in the Neolithic as a result of prehistoric migration from the Iberian peninsula. The author in his analysis of the Paleo-Sardinian language finds only a few traces of Indo-European influences (*ōsa, *debel- and perhaps *mara, *pal-, *nava, *sala), which were possibly introduced in the Late Chalcolithic through Liguria. Similarities between Paleo-Sardinian and Ancient Ligurian were also noted by Emidio De Felice. According to Max Leopold Wagner:

Bertoldi and Terracini propose that the common suffix -ara, stressed on the antepenult, was a plural marker, and they indicated a connection to Iberian or to the Paleo-Sicilian languages. Terracini claims a similar connection for the suffix -ànarV, -ànnarV, -énnarV, -ònnarV, as in the place name Bonnànnaro. A suffix -ini also seems to be characteristic, as in the place name Barùmini. A suffix or suffixes -arr-, -err-, -orr-, -urr- have been claimed to correspond to the North African Numidia (Terracini), to the Basque-speaking Iberia and Gascony (Wagner, Rohlfs, Blasco Ferrer, Hubschmid), and to southern Italy (Rohlfs).

The non-Latin suffixes -ài, -éi, -òi, -ùi survive in modern place names based on Latin roots. Terracini sees connections to Berber. Bertoldi sees an Anatolian connection in the endings -ài, -asài (similar claims have been made of the Elymians of Sicily). A suffix -aiko is also common in Iberia and may have a Celtic origin. The tribal suffix -itani, -etani, as in the Sulcitani, has also been identified as Paleo-Sardinian.

Etruscan-Nuragic connection
The linguist M. Pittau argues that the Paleo-Sardinian ("Sardian") language and the Etruscan language were closely linked, as he argues that they were both emanations of the Anatolian branch of Indo-European. According to Pittau, the "Nuragics" were a population of Lydian origin who imported their Indo-European language to the island, pushing out the Pre-Indo-European languages spoken by the Pre-Nuragic peoples.

Some examples of Nuragic names of Indo-European origin might be:

Other hypothesis

Archeologist Giovanni Ugas suggested that the three main Nuragic populations (Balares, Corsi and Ilienses) may have had separate origins and so may have spoken different languages:

the Balares might have possibly been from the Iberian peninsula or Southern France and thus of either Proto-Iberian or Indo-European origin, linked to the Beaker culture.
The Corsi from the north-east might have possibly been of Ligurian origin.
The Iolaei/Ilienses, who inhabited the southern plains and today's Barbagia, might have probably spoken a Pre-Indo-European language similar to Minoan and other languages of that area.

The common subdivision of modern Sardinian into the three dialects of Gallurese, Logudorese and Campidanese might reflect that multilingual substratum. Other Paleo-Sardinian tribes of possible Indo-European stock were the Lucuidonenses from the north of the island, who might have been originally from Provence, where the toponym Lugdunum is attested, and the Siculensi, perhaps related to the Siculi from Sicily, from the Sarrabus region.

According to Guido Borghi, researcher of glottology and linguistics at the University of Genoa, Indo-European appellations can be recognized in Paleo-Sardinian, as in the case of the toponym *Thìscali, which could derive from the Proto-Indo-European *Dʱĭhₓ-s-kə̥̥̆ₐ-lĭhₐ with the meaning of "the little (mountain) in the set of the territories which are in plain sight".

See also
Paleo-Corsican language
Pre-Nuragic Sardinia
Nuragic civilization
List of ancient Corsican and Sardinian tribes
History of Sardinia
Prehistory of Corsica

Notes

References
Alberto G. Areddu, Le origini albanesi della civiltà in Sardegna, Naples, Grafica Elettronica, 2007.
 
Johannes Hubschmid, Sardische Studien, Bern, 1953.
Massimo Pittau. La lingua sardiana o dei Protosardi, Cagliari: Ettore Gasperini, 2001.
Giulio Paulis, I nomi di luogo in Sardegna, Sassari, 1987.
Giulio Paulis. “Il paleosardo: retrospettive e prospettive”, Aion: Annali del Dipartimento di Studi del Mondo Classico e del Mediterraneo Antico — Sezione linguistica 30, no. 4 (2010): 11-61.

Further Reading 
 Ong, Brenda Man Qing, and Francesco Perono Cacciafoco. (2022). Unveiling the Enigmatic Origins of Sardinian Toponyms. Languages, 7, 2, 131: 1-19, Paper, DOI: https://doi.org/10.3390/languages7020131.

Extinct languages of Europe
Unclassified languages of Europe
Languages of Sardinia
Ancient peoples of Sardinia
Pre-Indo-European languages